The Fiat 124 Sport Coupé is a two-door, four-seater notchback coupé produced by the Italian automaker Fiat in three generations between 1967 and 1975. It was based on the Fiat 124 saloon.

Its four cylinder aluminum and iron, twin overhead cam 'Lampredi engine' was designed by ex-Ferrari engineer Aurelio Lampredi. Originally, the AC, or first generation, featured a 1,438 cc engine, which grew to 1,608 cc in the second, or BC, generation. The third generation, or CC, was first officially offered with the 1,592 cc and later the 1,756 cc engine (some early CC models left the factory with left over 1,608 cc engines).

Equipment included a 5-speed gearbox (although very early AC models featured a 4-speed), four wheel power disc brakes, double wishbone front suspension, one carburetor per cylinder (Two dual-choke Weber or Solex carburetors on the BC series 1608 engine - except for the USA version which received mild carburation due to emissions constraints), electric fuel pump (on the CC series), and suspension by coil springs.

The Fiat 124 Sport Coupé was also built under license in Spain with 1600 (FC-00) and 1800 (FC-02) engines as the SEAT 124 Sport.

Design
The 124 Sport Coupé was designed as a three-box, 2-door notchback coupé by Mario Boano, known for styling the bodywork on the Ferrari 250 GT "Boano".  As many parts as possible were used from the 1966 FIAT 124 Berlina saloon. Boano was hired by FIAT and made responsible for the in-house Centro Stile Fiat, while the iconic softtop Fiat 124 Sport Spider, which also shared the same basic platform as the 124 Sedan but rode on a 14 cm shorter wheelbase, was outsourced to famed Italian carrozzeria Pininfarina.

Approximately 113,000 AC Coupés, 98,000 BC Coupés 1438 cc/1608 cc, and roughly 75,000 CC Coupés were manufactured. There were ongoing changes with all models making them almost individual by year (e.g. lack of rear sway bar on 1969 ACs, etc.)

The Fiat 124 Spider Abarth came with dual Weber 44 IDF carburetors unlike the regular 124 coupés and spiders which were equipped with dual Weber 40 IDF carbs. Fiat twincam engines tend to be oversquare, with a larger diameter bore than length of stroke. The 1608 cc, however, is a perfectly square engine,  80 mm by 80 mm, allowing it, when combined with dual camshafts and proper carburetors, to rev to high rpms.

Engines
 1400 (1438 cc) - 
 1600 (1608 cc) - 
 1600 (1592 cc) - 
 1800 (1756 cc) -

History

First series, 1967–69 (type 124 AC)

1967  AC -  starts   000001 - #034513
1968  AC -          #034514 - #066279
1969  AC -          #066280 - #113869
The AC model began in 1967 and came with a 1438 cc twin cam, 4-speed gearbox (the option of a 5-speed item appearing in mid-'67), front and rear anti-roll bars and a torque tube rear axle. It featured a  speedometer, three supplementary gauges, a faux wood steering wheel, a woodgrain dash and console top, as well as tail lights shared with the Lamborghini Espada and Iso Rivolta.

124 Sport Coupés were modern in chassis and engine design. Braking was via four 230 mm disc brakes with a front/rear weight-sensitive proportioning valve. It also had a sealed cooling system, viscous fan clutch and a toothed timing belt for the twin-cam engine, the first mass-produced engine to feature this instead of the usual chain-drive.

The torque-tube rear axle of the A series was replaced by a four-link rear axle with a Panhard rod in mid-'68, and remained the same throughout B and C models.

Second series, 1969–72 (type 124 BC)

1970 BC -            #113870 - #115876
1971 BC  1438 cc -   #115877 - #139912
1971 BC1 1608 cc -   #139913
1972 BC1 1608 cc -   #181442

The BC featured revised styling with twin headlights and revised taillights shared with the Lamborghini Jarama.

The BC was available with both the 1438 cc and later (although sooner in Europe) the 1608 cc engine. Other details remained similar to the AC except the interior dash now had a  speedometer, 9000 rpm tachometer in 1608 cc models and a clock. The steering wheel now had black painted spokes and the seats had for the first time cloth inserts in the centre. There was no woodgrain inside like before (all the panels were finished in black vinyl and the gauge rims were matt black) and "eyeball" vents were fitted in the centre console where the AC had a decorative panel simply filling in the space for an optional radio.

Options included green tinted windows, Cromodora alloy wheels with chrome centre hub cap (as per AC optional), radio, seat headrests, rear windshield electric defrosting, electronic ignition. At the end of the BC run air conditioning was available as an option as well.

Third series, 1972–75 (type 124 CC)

1973 CC  1608 cc -   #206905
1973 CC  1592 cc -   #213370
1974 CC1 1756 cc -   #240100
1975 CC1 1756 cc -   #269934

The CC Coupe arrived in 1973 with new front styling and a revised squarer rear tail with a new deeper trunklid. Taillights also changed to a now vertical arrangement and side rear windows were revised.

The CC started with a small batch fitted with the 1608 cc engine, soon changing to a revised 1592 cc engine (slightly shorter stroke at 79,2 mm to create a "sub-1600" engine to fit the lower tax bracket in Italy) and an enlarged 84 mm bore creating an engine of 1756 cc. The 1592 cc and 1756 cc (sourced from the new Fiat 132, introduced in 1972) both made use of a single carburetor again (the Weber 34 DMS).

The CC's revised interior featured a new dashboard incorporating a lower panel on the passenger side, an alloy fascia in front of the driver and seats covered completely in cloth. There was a new vinyl-covered steering wheel rim with anodised silver spokes. The optional but not uncommon Cromodora wheels now had a revised design with no chrome centre hubcap, instead having exposed wheelnuts. These were of an 8 slot design, the earlier wheels used coming in 6 slot configuration (an 8-slot design was also current but not original to the 124 range).

SEAT 124 Sport

The car was also built with 1600 (FC-00) and 1800 (FC-02) engines under license in Spain as the SEAT 124 Sport. The first series produced was equivalent to the BC series of Fiat's version, and used 1608 cc engines coded FA provided by Fiat itself. The second series was a direct copy of the CC model, and only used 1756 cc engines coded as FC, and less common 132AC. SEAT later developed facilities for producing its own engines of this family, but it appears that the Sport versions were actually built in Italy.

References

External links
 Fiat 124 Sport Coupé Italia

124 Coupe
1970s cars
Rear-wheel-drive vehicles
Cars powered by longitudinal 4-cylinder engines
Sports cars
Coupés
Cars introduced in 1967